Oslomej is a village in Kičevo Municipality in North Macedonia. It was the seat of the now-defunct Oslomej Municipality and is the birthplace of Yoakim Karchovski.

Demographics
According to the 2002 census, the village had a total of 40 inhabitants. Ethnic groups in the village include:

Macedonians 40

References

External links

Villages in Kičevo Municipality